The Country of Blinds is a studio album by American experimental rock and jazz band Skeleton Crew, recorded at Sunrise Studio, Kirchberg, Switzerland, December 1985 and January 1986. It was their second and final album and was released in 1986.

Skeleton Crew had become the trio of Fred Frith, Tom Cora and Zeena Parkins when this album was made. The music here is richer, more rhythmical and the songs more developed than on their first album, and this ultimately led to the band's break-up. Frith explained that "we actually started to sound like a normal rock and roll band so it seemed kind of pointless to go on at that point."

Track listing

Track notes
"Money Crack", "Hot Field" and the last section of "You May Find a Bed" were recorded live in Reykjavík, Iceland, November 4, 1985.

Personnel
Tom Cora – cello, bass, accordion, drums, contraptions, singing
Fred Frith – guitar, 6-string bass, violin, home-mades, drums, singing
Zeena Parkins – organ, electric harp, accordion, drums, singing

Sound and art work
Tim Hodgkinson – engineer, producer
Katrina Brändli – assistant engineer
Fred Frith – cover art work

CD reissues
In 1990 RecRec Music re-issued The Country of Blinds together with Skeleton Crew's previous album Learn to Talk on a single compilation CD, Learn to Talk / Country of Blinds, omitting "Money Crack" from The Country of Blinds, and "Los Colitos" and "Life At The Top" from Learn to Talk.

In 2005 Fred Records re-issued Learn to Talk / Country of Blinds on a double compilation CD, omitting only "Money Crack" from The Country of Blinds, and adding ten extra tracks.

References

1986 albums
Experimental music albums by American artists
RecRec Music albums
Albums produced by Tim Hodgkinson